Budești is a commune in Bistrița-Năsăud County, Transylvania, Romania. It is composed of four villages: Budești, Budești-Fânațe (Szénásbudatelke), Țagu (Nagycég) and Țăgșoru (Kiscég).

References

Communes in Bistrița-Năsăud County
Localities in Transylvania